Wells Fargo Center is a skyscraper located in Denver, Colorado, United States. The building is also known by its former name One Norwest Center. It is known colloquially as the Cash Register Building for the way its uppermost floors curve together resembling the shape of an antique cash register.

The building was designed by architect Philip Johnson, under a master plan by I. M. Pei, and was completed in 1983. As it was originally designed to be for a downtown area in Texas, a heated roof is necessary to prevent snow from accumulating and sliding dangerously off the curved crown. Located at 1700 Lincoln Street, a skybridge over Lincoln Street connects the Wells Fargo Center to the older Mile High Center at 1700 Broadway; which houses a food court, Starbucks, a small museum featuring artifacts, and memorabilia from Wells Fargo history, and the Downtown Denver branch of Wells Fargo Bank. Both buildings have large atria constructed in the same cash register style.

The building has its own unique zip code, 80274.

Building owners Beacon Capital Partners undertook a three-year renovation of the lobby which was completed in 2016. As part of the renovation, experience design firm ESI Design created an 8-story digital art installation in the building's glass atrium and added new furniture and lighting. New York artist Enoc Perez (Puerto Rican, born 1967) was commissioned to create 14 paintings and 5 sculptures for the site.

Gallery

References

Skyscraper office buildings in Denver
I. M. Pei buildings 
Philip Johnson buildings
Office buildings completed in 1983
Wells Fargo buildings